Tirumati Leelawathy Ramanathan (née R. L. Harrison in 1870) was the Australia-born wife of Ponnambalam Ramanathan of the Ponnambalam-Coomaraswamy family. Lady Ramanathan was an Englishwoman who was born in Australia where her father was involved in gold mining. All references to her maiden name record her only as R.L. Harrison. She, as a young woman, had been attracted by the Theosophical Movement in Australia and, searching for further spiritual enlightenment, arrived in Ceylon where Sir Thiru Ponnambalam Ramanathan became her guru. Later she married Ramanathan who had been a widower for many years. She became a Hindu and took the name Leelavathy. After the reformed Council years, they spent much of their time in Kodaikanal where they had three houses, Ammanadi, Sivanadi, and Muruganadi. When Sir Ramanathan died in 1924, she took to wearing the white of a Hindu widow, built the Kurinji Andavar Temple in her husband's memory, overlooking the Palani shrine of Lord Sri Muruga. Along its slopes that would be covered with kurinji flowers, she would perform a Puja and worship there every afternoon. It is said that she took solace in paying obeisance to the deities of the Saiva and Saktha traditions and immersing herself in the study of Hindu theology.

Hinduism
She studied Hindu scriptures, and converted to Hinduism upon marrying Ponnambalam Ramanathan in 1906. She wrote many Hindu books, including a version of the Ramayana in English. She also published many of Ponnambalam's lectures on Hinduism.

References

1870 births
Converts to Hinduism
Hindu activists
Hindu writers
Australian Hindus
Sri Lankan Hindus
Australian emigrants to Sri Lanka
Year of death missing